Yuyan is a common Chinese homonym or synonym which has various meanings.

 Yuyan [Yùyán] (毓嵒), Chinese calligrapher
 Fable (album), [Yùyán] (寓言), a Mandarin pop album by Faye Wong; sometimes translated "Fable", or less accurately "Legend" in English.
 yuyan - in the Chinese literary tradition, a messenger between lovers (Zheng, 2010)

See also
 [yǔyán] language
 [yùyán] prophecy
 [yùyán] fable

Yan Yu (disambiguation)